Bichitr (fl. 17th century) was an Indian painter during the Mughal period, patronized by the emperors Jahangir and Shah Jahan.

The earliest known painting of his is a mature work from c. 1615. He was possibly still active in 1660. Britannica notes that his "court style may have been the most brilliant of all the Mughal painters", with "faultless technique and majestic formality." Influenced by his studies of European artworks, Bichtir incorporated figures with shadows, Western perspective, and putti into his work.

References

Mughal painters
17th-century Indian painters
Indian male painters